Spalding Amateur Dramatic & Operatic Society of Spalding, Lincolnshire is the oldest amateur theatre society in England.  The South Holland Centre is the current venue for performances.

History
In 1866 a group of Spalding Gentlemen formed an Amateur Society for the performance of plays, some of which must have been musical plays as accounts show charges of £5 5s for an orchestra. In 1928 an Operatic Society was formed to present musical plays and the happy union of this society with the older society created SADOS, as it is known today. In 1969 an urgent need for new scenery flats for the Dramatic Section led to the suggestion of a pantomime performance to raise funds.

Other activities
Ex-members maintain the S.A.D.O.S. experiment.

External links
 SADOS web site.
 South Holland Centre web site.

1928 establishments in England
Amateur theatre companies in England
Culture in Lincolnshire
Musical groups established in 1928
Organisations based in Lincolnshire
Spalding, Lincolnshire